Christmas for You is the eleventh studio album by German singer Thomas Anders. It was released by Electrola on 16 November 2012 in German-speaking Europe. His first Christmas album, it debuted and peaked at number 99 on the German Albums Chart.

Track listing
All tracks produced by Achim Brochhausen and Thomas Anders.

Charts

Release history

References

2012 albums
Thomas Anders albums
Christmas albums by German artists